Ludwig Wilhelm Andreas Maria Thuille (Bozen, 30 November 1861 – 5 February 1907) was an Austrian composer and teacher, numbered for a while among the leading operatic composers of the so-called Munich School of composers, whose most famous representative was Richard Strauss.

Biography
Thuille was born in Bozen, then part of Tyrol, now in Italy.

He lost both his parents in 1872 when he was 11, and moved in with his step-uncle in Kremsmünster, Austria. There he sang in the Benedictine choir and studied organ, piano, and violin. His musical abilities were exceptional, so in 1876 the widow of a composer/ conductor, Matthaus Nagiller, took him to Innsbruck for more advanced musical training. There, in the summer of 1877, he met the young Richard Strauss, whose family was visiting the town; the two became lifelong friends. His Innsbruck teacher of organ and theory recommended him to the distinguished composer Josef Rheinberger in Munich, who took him as a pupil in the  Hochschule für Musik und Theater München, from where he graduated with honors in 1882. A year later he became a teacher, and few years thereafter a professor of theory and composition. His many pupils included Hermann Abendroth, Ernest Bloch, Richard Wetz, Paul von Klenau, Rudi Stephan, Walter Braunfels, Mabel Wheeler Daniels, Henry Kimball Hadley and Walter R. Spalding, who became the head of the Division of Music at Harvard University, and later taught Leroy Anderson.

A prolific composer, Thuille concentrated on chamber music - he is remembered principally for his Sextet for piano and wind instruments (1886–88), the only one of his works to have kept a toehold on the repertoire - and opera, though his early works include a Piano Concerto and a Symphony. In 1897 his opera Theuerdank gained the first prize and a prestigious staged premiere in an operatic competition sponsored by the Regent of Bavaria, in which Alexander von Zemlinsky was placed second. His second opera Lobetanz was premiered the following year in Karlsruhe and was a considerable, if short-lived, success. He also composed a Symphony in F major, much praised by Strauss, five other chamber works, 13 choral pieces, and 78 songs.

Despite his friendship with Strauss (which extended to making a 2-piano arrangement of the latter's tone poem Don Juan), and despite his devotion to music-drama, Thuille remained a fairly conservative composer during his brief life. He died at the age of 45 in 1907 in Munich of heart failure.  He was married for twenty years to Emma (née Dietl) until his death. They had two children.

Though neglected as a composer, Thuille his posthumously-published Harmonielehre (written in collaboration with Rudolf Louis) went through many editions and was highly influential. Widely employed as part of the conservatory curriculum in German speaking countries through the 1960s, the Harmonielehre in two volumes is an important theoretical formulation devoted innovatively to the practices of the Munich School of composers, and remains one of few existing records providing examples of this music.

While Thuille's Sextet has always retained a certain following, several of his other compositions have become commercially available on CD only in recent years — his two Piano Quintets, the Piano Trio in E-flat, the Piano Concerto in D and the Symphony in F among them.

List of selected works
Operas
 Theuerdank
 Lobetanz, Op.10

Orchestral works
 Romantic Overture, Op.16 (Prelude to Act I of Theuerdank)
 Symphonicher Festmarsch, Op.38
 Symphony in F
 Piano Concerto in D

Keyboard
 Organ sonata in A minor, Op. 2
 3 Piano Pieces, Op.3
 3 Piano Pieces, Op.33
 3 Piano Pieces, Op.34
 2 Piano Pieces, Op.37

Chamber
 Violin Sonata in D minor, No.1, Op.1
 Sextet for Piano and Wind Quintet in B-flat major, Op.6
 Piano Quintet in E-flat major, No.2, Op.20
 Cello Sonata, Op.22
 Violin Sonata in E minor, No.2, Op.30
 Allegro Giusto, Op.39, for Violin and Piano
 Piano Trio in E-flat major
 Piano Quintet in G minor
 String Quartet in A major, No.1
 String Quartet in G major, No.2, WoO
 Quartett-Satz for String Quartet in A major

Vocal
78 solo songs, including:
 5 Lieder, Op.4
 3 Lieder for female voice, Op. 5 
 Song-cycle, Von Lieb' und Leid, Op. 7
 3 Lieder Op. 12 
 3 Lieder, Op.15
 3 Lieder, Op.26 
 4 Lieder, Op.27
 Urschlamm-Idyll, song for bass voice and piano (1908)

13 choral pieces, including:
 Weihnacht im Walde, Op. 14 for men's chorus
 Traumsommernacht, Op. 25, for women's chorus with harp and violin
 Rosenlied, Op. 29, for three-part women's chorus with piano

References

Further reading
 Munter, Friedrich. Ludwig Thuille: Ein enter Versuch. Munich: Drei Masken Verlag, 1923.

External links
 

 Texts of songs by Ludwig Thuille at The LiederNet Archive
 

1861 births
1907 deaths
Burials at Munich Waldfriedhof
Musicians from Bolzano
Austrian Romantic composers
Austrian opera composers
Male opera composers
German music educators
Austrian people of French descent
German music theorists
University of Music and Performing Arts Munich alumni
Pupils of Josef Rheinberger
Austrian male classical composers
20th-century Italian male musicians
19th-century Italian male musicians
19th-century German musicologists